Andrew McMillan (born 1988) is an English poet and lecturer.

Biography 
McMillan was born near Barnsley, South Yorkshire. He is the son of poet Ian McMillan. He studied at University of Lancaster, and then at University College London, and is now Senior Lecturer in Creative Writing at Manchester Metropolitan University.

His debut collection, Physical, was published by Jonathan Cape in 2015. It was the first collection of poems to win the Guardian First Book Award, and also won a Somerset Maugham Award and the Fenton Aldeburgh First Collection Prize.

His second collection, playtime, was published by Jonathan Cape in 2018, and won the inaugural Polari Prize.

McMillan lives in Manchester.

Bibliography 

 pandemonium (2021)
 playtime (2018)
 physical (2015)

References 

People from Barnsley
Alumni of University College London
English poets
People from Manchester
1988 births
Living people

English LGBT poets